"Dead Leaves and the Dirty Ground" is a song by American garage rock band the White Stripes, featured on their 2001 third studio album White Blood Cells. Written and produced by vocalist and guitarist Jack White, "Dead Leaves" was released as the third single from the album in July 2002, charting at number 19 on the US Billboard Modern Rock Tracks chart and number 25 on the UK Singles Chart.

Reception
In a review of the song for AllMusic, Tom Maginnis describes "Dead Leaves and the Dirty Ground" as a "grimy rocker", noting it as a display of the duo's "keen understanding of musical dynamics". Paste and Stereogum ranked the song number three and number five, respectively, on their lists of the 10 greatest White Stripes songs.

Music video
The music video for this song, directed by Michel Gondry, depicts Jack White coming back to his trashed London house and surveying reckless destruction. While he goes from room to room, video of the party events that led to the decimation (and of his and Meg's relationship before he left) is projected over the scenery, until in the final scene she leaves him.

Track listings
All songs were written by Jack White, except "Stop Breaking Down" by Robert Johnson.

7-inch vinyl (XLS 148)
"Dead Leaves and the Dirty Ground"
"Stop Breaking Down" (Robert Johnson cover; live at the BBC Studios, Maida Vale)

CD single (XLS 148CD)
"Dead Leaves and the Dirty Ground"
"Suzy Lee" (live at the BBC Studios, Maida Vale)
"Stop Breaking Down" (live at the BBC Studios, Maida Vale)

DVD single (XLS 148DVD)
"Dead Leaves and the Dirty Ground" (music video)
Interview with Arthur P. Dottweiler

Charts

Release history

Use in Rock Band
The song was made available to download on May 23, 2011, for play in the Rock Band 3 music gaming platform in both Basic rhythm, and PRO mode which takes advantage of the use of a real guitar / bass guitar, along with standard MIDI-compatible electronic drum kits / keyboards in addition to vocals.

Cover versions
 Mandolin virtuoso Chris Thile covered "Dead Leaves and the Dirty Ground" on his 2006 album How to Grow a Woman from the Ground in a bluegrass style.
 Nina Persson covered this song in the 2006 film Om Gud Vill (God Willing).
 Jack White performed this song with Jimmy Page and the Edge in the 2009 documentary It Might Get Loud.
 The main riffs and vocal patterns were borrowed in "Weird Al" Yankovic's 2009 White Stripes style parody "CNR".

References

External links
 White Stripes.Net FAQ
 

2001 songs
2002 singles
Music videos directed by Michel Gondry
Songs written by Jack White
V2 Records singles
The White Stripes songs
XL Recordings singles